The 8th Army Corps was an Army corps in the Imperial Russian Army.

Composition
14th Infantry Division
15th Infantry Division
8th Cavalry Division

Part of
8th Army: 1914-1916
11th Army: 1916
9th Army: 1916
4th Army: 1916-1917

Commanders
Fyodor Radetzky: 1877-1878
Radko Dimitriev: 1914
Vladimir Dragomirov: 1915-1916
Anton Denikin: 1916-1917

Corps of the Russian Empire
Military units and formations established in 1876
Military units and formations disestablished in 1918
1876 establishments in the Russian Empire